The 1988 San Jose State Spartans football team represented San Jose State University during the 1988 NCAA Division I-A football season as a member of the Big West Conference. The team was led by head coach Claude Gilbert, in his fifth year as head coach at San Jose State. They played home games at Spartan Stadium in San Jose, California. The Spartans finished the 1988 season with a record of four wins and eight losses (4–8, 4–3 Big West).

Schedule

Team players in the NFL
The following were selected in the 1989 NFL Draft.

Notes

References

San Jose State
San Jose State Spartans football seasons
San Jose State Spartans football